The Trunks of Mr. O.F. (German: Die Koffer des Herrn O.F.) is a 1931 German comedy film directed by Alexis Granowsky and starring Alfred Abel, Peter Lorre, and Harald Paulsen. Produced by Tobis Film, it was made at the Johannisthal Studios in Berlin with sets designed by the art director Erich Czerwonski. The film was shot between 15 September and 17 October 1931 and premiered in Berlin's Mozartsaal on 2 December 1931. The film was then heavily cut down to a shorter running time, and re-released under the alternative title Building and Marrying (Bauen und heiraten). It received its Viennese premiere on 4 June 1932.

It received a mixed reception from critics who were divided over its non-realist, fantastical elements. The film's screenwriter Léo Lania intended it to be a critique of capitalism.

Plot
When thirteen large suitcases arrive at a hotel in a small town, labeled as belonging to a mysterious O.F., they provoke curiosity and speculation. Rumours begin to spread like wildfire that they belong to a millionaire. Although O.F. fails to appear, his anticipated arrival is a catalyst for a series of dramatic changes in the town.

Cast

References

External links

Die Koffer des Herrn O. F. Full movie at the Deutsche Filmothek

Films of the Weimar Republic
1931 comedy films
German comedy films
Films directed by Alexis Granowsky
Tobis Film films
German black-and-white films
Films shot at Johannisthal Studios
1930s German films
1930s German-language films